Cerceris tuberculata is a species of wasp in the family Crabronidae.

Description

The adult female of Cerceris tuberculata digs a nest in the soil at a depth of about 50 cm. and provisions it with living prey items she has paralyzed with venom. Prey items are commonly weevils of the genus Cleonis.

Adults fly from mid-July to September. They feed on the nectar of flowers (usually Apiaceae and Asteraceae).

Distribution
This species is present in Albania, Bulgaria, Croatia, France, Greece, Hungary, Italy, Portugal, Russia, Spain and former Jugoslavia.

References

Crabronidae
Hymenoptera of Europe
Insects described in 1787